Two ships of the British Royal Navy have been named HMS Pelican Prize.

Pelican Prize was a 34 gun ship captured in 1653 and sold in 1655.
Pelican Prize was an 8 gun fireship captured from France on 7 July 1690 off Dublin and scuttled on 26 August 1692 to form part of the foundations at Sheerness Dockyard.

See also

References
 

Royal Navy ship names